The M85 expressway is a Hungarian expressway connecting Győr to Sopron. It will eventually connect M1 motorway to the Austrian border.

Openings timeline
Győr; M1 – Enese (8 km): 2015.06.16.
Enese bypass (7 km): 2011.12.21.
Enese – Kóny (3 km): 2015.06.16.
Kóny – Csorna (6 km): 2015.09.09.
Csorna bypass; I.section (east) (5 km): 2015.09.09.; (this section was extended 2x3 lane)
Csorna bypass; II.section (west) (4.5 km): 2017.12.15.
Csorna -Sopron Kelet, 51km, 2020.12.16

Junctions, exits and rest area

 The route is full length expressway.

 Under construction,  Planned section

Maintenance
The operation and maintenance of the road by Hungarian Public Road Nonprofit Pte Ltd Co. This activity is provided by these highway engineers.
 in Csorna, mixed - use engineering
 near Nagycenk, kilometre trench 71 (under construction)

Payment
Hungarian system has 2 main type in terms of salary:

1, time-based fee vignettes (E-matrica); with a validity of either 10 days (3500 HUF), 1 month (4780 HUF) or 1 year (42980 HUF).

2, county vignettes (Megyei matrica); the highway can be used instead of the national sticker with the following county stickers:

{| class="wikitable"
|- 
!Type of county vignette !! Available section
|-
|Győr-Moson-Sopron County
| full length (0 km – 83 km)
|}

See also 

 Roads in Hungary
 Transport in Hungary

References

External links 

National Toll Payment Services Plc. (in Hungarian, some information also in English)
 Hungarian Public Road Non-Profit Ltd. (Magyar Közút Nonprofit Zrt.)
 National Infrastructure Developer Ltd.

85
Győr-Moson-Sopron County